Haji Gam is a town in the Skardu District of Gilgit–Baltistan in Pakistan.  It is bounded to the west by Satpara Lake, to east by Abbas Town/division, to north by Khargrong, and to south by Hargisa.   Skardu. The most common spoken language is Shina language Shina as the people migrated from Derlay and Chillim Astore . Through Haji Gham it is possible to reach Sadpara, which leads to Deosai, the second highest plain in the world, after Tibetan plains

Haji Gam is a fairly educated area of Skardu.

.

References

Baltistan
Populated places in Skardu District
Valleys of Gilgit-Baltistan